Uropterygius versutus is a moray eel found in the eastern Pacific Ocean, from Mexico to Panama. It is commonly known as the two-holes moray, or the crafty moray. It dwells on sand and between rocks on ocean floors.

References

versutus
Fish described in 1991